Albertus Magnus  (c. 1200 – 15 November 1280), also known as Saint Albert the Great or Albert of Cologne, was a German Dominican friar, philosopher, scientist, and bishop. Later canonized as a Catholic saint, he was known during his lifetime as Doctor universalis and Doctor expertus and, late in his life, the sobriquet Magnus was appended to his name. Scholars such as James A. Weisheipl and Joachim R. Söder have referred to him as the greatest German philosopher and theologian of the Middle Ages. The Catholic Church distinguishes him as one of the 37 Doctors of the Church.

Biography
It seems likely that Albert was born sometime before 1200, given well-attested evidence that he was aged over 80 on his death in 1280. Two later sources say that Albert was about 87 on his death, which has led 1193 to be commonly given as the date of Albert's birth, but this information does not have enough evidence to be confirmed. Albert was probably born in Lauingen (now in Bavaria), since he called himself 'Albert of Lauingen', but this might simply be a family name. Most probably his family was of ministerial class; his familiar connection with (being son of the count) the Bollstädt noble family is almost certainly mere conjecture by 15th century hagiographers.

Albert was probably educated principally at the University of Padua, where he received instruction in Aristotle's writings. A late account by Rudolph de Novamagia refers to Albertus' encounter with the Blessed Virgin Mary, who convinced him to enter Holy Orders. In 1223 (or 1229) he became a member of the Dominican Order, and studied theology at Bologna and elsewhere. Selected to fill the position of lecturer at Cologne, Germany, where the Dominicans had a house, he taught for several years there, as well as in Regensburg, Freiburg, Strasbourg, and Hildesheim. During his first tenure as lecturer at Cologne, Albert wrote his Summa de bono after discussion with Philip the Chancellor concerning the transcendental properties of being. In 1245, Albert became master of theology under Gueric of Saint-Quentin, the first German Dominican to achieve this distinction. Following this turn of events, Albert was able to teach theology at the University of Paris as a full-time professor, holding the seat of the Chair of Theology at the College of St. James. During this time Thomas Aquinas began to study under Albertus.

Albert was the first to comment on virtually all of the writings of Aristotle, thus making them accessible to wider academic debate. The study of Aristotle brought him to study and comment on the teachings of Muslim academics, notably Avicenna and Averroes, and this would bring him into the heart of academic debate.

In 1254 Albert was made provincial of the Dominican Order, and fulfilled the duties of the office with great care and efficiency. During his tenure he publicly defended the Dominicans against attacks by the secular and regular faculty of the University of Paris, commented on John the Evangelist, and answered what he perceived as errors of the Islamic philosopher Averroes.

In 1259 Albert took part in the General Chapter of the Dominicans at Valenciennes together with Thomas Aquinas, masters Bonushomo Britto, Florentius, and Peter (later Pope Innocent V) establishing a ratio studiorum or program of studies for the Dominicans that featured the study of philosophy as an innovation for those not sufficiently trained to study theology. This innovation initiated the tradition of Dominican scholastic philosophy put into practice, for example, in 1265 at the Order's studium provinciale at the convent of Santa Sabina in Rome, out of which would develop the Pontifical University of Saint Thomas Aquinas, the "Angelicum".

In 1260 Pope Alexander IV made him bishop of Regensburg, an office from which he resigned after three years. During the exercise of his duties he enhanced his reputation for humility by refusing to ride a horse, in accord with the dictates of the Order, instead traversing his huge diocese on foot. In 1263 Pope Urban IV relieved him of the duties of bishop and asked him to preach the eighth Crusade in German-speaking countries. After this, he was especially known for acting as a mediator between conflicting parties. In Cologne he is known not only for being the founder of Germany's oldest university there, but also for "the big verdict" (der Große Schied) of 1258, which brought an end to the conflict between the citizens of Cologne and the archbishop. Among the last of his labors was the defense of the orthodoxy of his former pupil, Thomas Aquinas, whose death in 1274 grieved Albert (the story that he travelled to Paris in person to defend the teachings of Aquinas can not be confirmed).

Albert was a scientist, philosopher, astrologer, theologian, spiritual writer, ecumenist, and diplomat. Under the auspices of Humbert of Romans, Albert molded the curriculum of studies for all Dominican students, introduced Aristotle to the classroom and probed the work of Neoplatonists, such as Plotinus. Indeed, it was the thirty years of work done by Aquinas and himself that allowed for the inclusion of Aristotelian study in the curriculum of Dominican schools.

After suffering a collapse of health in 1278, he died on 15 November 1280 in the Dominican convent in Cologne, Germany. Since 15 November 1954 his relics are in a Roman sarcophagus in the crypt of the Dominican St. Andrew's Church in Cologne. Although his body was discovered to be incorrupt at the first exhumation three years after his death, at the exhumation in 1483 only a skeleton remained.

Albert was beatified in 1622. He was canonized and proclaimed a Doctor of the Church on 16 December 1931 by Pope Pius XI and the patron saint of natural scientists in 1941. St. Albert's feast day is November 15.

Writings

Albert's writings collected in 1899 went to thirty-eight volumes. These displayed his prolific habits and encyclopedic knowledge of topics such as logic, theology, botany, geography, astronomy, astrology, mineralogy, alchemy, zoology, physiology, phrenology, justice, law, friendship, and love. He digested, interpreted, and systematized the whole of Aristotle's works, gleaned from the Latin translations and notes of the Arabian commentators, in accordance with Church doctrine. Most modern knowledge of Aristotle was preserved and presented by Albert.

His principal theological works are a commentary in three volumes on the Books of the Sentences of Peter Lombard (Magister Sententiarum), and the Summa Theologiae in two volumes. The latter is in substance a more didactic repetition of the former.

Albert's activity, however, was more philosophical than theological (see Scholasticism). The philosophical works, occupying the first six and the last of the 21 volumes, are generally divided according to the Aristotelian scheme of the sciences, and consist of interpretations and condensations of Aristotle's relative works, with supplementary discussions upon contemporary topics, and occasional divergences from the opinions of the master. Albert believed that Aristotle's approach to natural philosophy did not pose any obstacle to the development of a Christian philosophical view of the natural order.

Albert's knowledge of natural science was considerable and for the age remarkably accurate. His industry in every department was great: not only did he produce commentaries and paraphrases of the entire Aristotelian corpus, including his scientific works, but Albert also added to and improved upon them. His books on topics like botany, zoology, and minerals included information from ancient sources, but also results of his own empirical investigations. These investigations pushed several of the special sciences forward, beyond the reliance on classical texts. In the case of embryology, for example, it has been claimed that little of value was written between Aristotle and Albert, who managed to identify organs within eggs. Furthermore, Albert also effectively invented entire special sciences, where Aristotle has not covered a topic. For example, prior to Albert, there was no systematic study of minerals. For the breadth of these achievements, he was bestowed the name Doctor Universalis.

Much of Albert's empirical contributions to the natural sciences have been superseded, but his general approach to science may be surprisingly modern. For example, in De Mineralibus (Book II, Tractate ii, Ch. 1) Albert claims, "For it is [the task] of natural science not simply to accept what we are told but to inquire into the causes of natural things."

Alchemy

In the centuries since his death, many stories arose about Albert as an alchemist and magician. "Much of the modern confusion results from the fact that later works, particularly the alchemical work known as the Secreta Alberti or the Experimenta Alberti, were falsely attributed to Albertus by their authors to increase the prestige of the text through association." On the subject of alchemy and chemistry, many treatises relating to alchemy have been attributed to him, though in his authentic writings he had little to say on the subject, and then mostly through commentary on Aristotle. For example, in his commentary, De mineralibus, he refers to the power of stones, but does not elaborate on what these powers might be. A wide range of Pseudo-Albertine works dealing with alchemy exist, though, showing the belief developed in the generations following Albert's death that he had mastered alchemy, one of the fundamental sciences of the Middle Ages. These include Metals and Materials; the Secrets of Chemistry; the Origin of Metals; the Origins of Compounds, and a Concordance which is a collection of Observations on the philosopher's stone; and other alchemy-chemistry topics, collected under the name of Theatrum Chemicum. He is credited with the discovery of the element arsenic and experimented with photosensitive chemicals, including silver nitrate. He did believe that stones had occult properties, as he related in his work De mineralibus. However, there is scant evidence that he personally performed alchemical experiments.

According to legend, Albert is said to have discovered the philosopher's stone and passed it on to his pupil Thomas Aquinas, shortly before his death. Albert does not confirm he discovered the stone in his writings, but he did record that he witnessed the creation of gold by "transmutation." Given that Thomas Aquinas died six years before Albert's death, this legend as stated is unlikely.

Astronomy
Albert was deeply interested in astronomy, as has been articulated by scholars such as Paola Zambelli and Scott Hendrix. Throughout the Middle Ages –and well into the early modern period– astrology was widely accepted by scientists and intellectuals who held the view that life on earth is effectively a microcosm within the macrocosm (the latter being the cosmos itself). It was believed that correspondence therefore exists between the two and thus the celestial bodies follow patterns and cycles analogous to those on earth. With this worldview, it seemed reasonable to assert that astrology could be used to predict the probable future of a human being. Albert argued that an understanding of the celestial influences affecting us could help us to live our lives more in accord with Christian precepts. The most comprehensive statement of his astrological beliefs is to be found in two separates works that he authored around 1260, known as the Speculum astronomiae and the De Fato. However, details of these beliefs can be found in almost everything he wrote, from his early De natura boni to his last work, the Summa theologiae. His speculum was critiqued by Gerard of Silteo.

Matter and form
Albert believed that all natural things were compositions of matter and form, he referred to it as quod est and quo est. Albert also believed that God alone is the absolute ruling entity. Albert's version of hylomorphism is very similar to the Aristotelian doctrine.

Music
Albert is known for his commentary on the musical practice of his times. Most of his written musical observations are found in his commentary on Aristotle's Poetics. He rejected the idea of "music of the spheres" as ridiculous: movement of astronomical bodies, he supposed, is incapable of generating sound. He wrote extensively on proportions in music, and on the three different subjective levels on which plainchant could work on the human soul: purging of the impure; illumination leading to contemplation; and nourishing perfection through contemplation. Of particular interest to 20th-century music theorists is the attention he paid to silence as an integral part of music.

Metaphysics of morals
Both of his early treatises, De natura boni and De bono, start with a metaphysical investigation into the concepts of the good in general and the physical good. Albert refers to the physical good as bonum naturae. Albert does this before directly dealing with the moral concepts of metaphysics. In Albert's later works, he says in order to understand human or moral goodness, the individual must first recognize what it means to be good and do good deeds. This procedure reflects Albert's preoccupations with neo-Platonic theories of good as well as the doctrines of Pseudo-Dionysius. Albert's view was highly valued by the Catholic Church and his peers.

Natural law
Albert devoted the last tractatus of De Bono to a theory of justice and natural law. Albert places God as the pinnacle of justice and natural law. God legislates and divine authority is supreme. Up until his time, it was the only work specifically devoted to natural law written by a theologian or philosopher.

Friendship
Albert mentions friendship in his work, De bono, as well as presenting his ideals and morals of friendship in the very beginning of Tractatus II. Later in his life he published Super Ethica. With his development of friendship throughout his work it is evident that friendship ideals and morals took relevance as his life went on. Albert comments on Aristotle's view of friendship with a quote from Cicero, who writes, "friendship is nothing other than the harmony between things divine and human, with goodwill and love". Albert agrees with this commentary but he also adds in harmony or agreement. Albert calls this harmony, consensio, itself a certain kind of movement within the human spirit. Albert fully agrees with Aristotle in the sense that friendship is a virtue. Albert relates the inherent metaphysical contentedness between friendship and moral goodness. Albert describes several levels of goodness; the useful (utile), the pleasurable (delectabile) and the authentic or unqualified good (honestum). Then in turn there are three levels of friendship based on each of those levels, namely friendship based on usefulness (amicitia utilis), friendship based on pleasure (amicitia delectabilis), and friendship rooted in unqualified goodness (amicitia honesti; amicitia quae fundatur super honestum).

Cultural references

The iconography of the tympanum and archivolts of the late 13th-century portal of Strasbourg Cathedral was inspired by Albert's writings. Albert is frequently mentioned by Dante, who made his doctrine of free will the basis of his ethical system. In his Divine Comedy, Dante places Albertus with his pupil Thomas Aquinas among the great lovers of wisdom (Spiriti Sapienti) in the Heaven of the Sun.

In The Concept of Anxiety, Søren Kierkegaard wrote that Albert, "arrogantly boasted of his speculation before the deity and suddenly became stupid." Kierkegaard cites Gotthard Oswald Marbach whom he quotes as saying "Albertus repente ex asino factus philosophus et ex philosopho asinus" [Albert was suddenly transformed from an ass into a philosopher and from a philosopher into an ass].

In Mary Shelley's Frankenstein, the titular Frankenstein studies the works of Albertus Magnus.

Johann Eduard Erdmann considers Albert greater and more original than his pupil Aquinas.

In Open All Hours, Arkwright invents St Albert's day so Grandville can check customers pockets.

Influence and tribute

A number of schools have been named after Albert, including Albertus Magnus High School in Bardonia, New York; Albertus Magnus Lyceum in River Forest, Illinois; and Albertus Magnus College in New Haven, Connecticut.

Albertus Magnus Science Hall at Thomas Aquinas College, in Santa Paula, California, is named in honor of Albert. The main science buildings at Providence College and Aquinas College in Grand Rapids, Michigan, are also named after him.

The central square at the campus of the University of Cologne features a statue of Albert and is named after him.

The Academy for Science and Design in New Hampshire honored Albert by naming one of its four houses Magnus House.

As a tribute to the scholar's contributions to the law, the University of Houston Law Center displays a statue of Albert. It is located on the campus of the University of Houston.

The Albertus-Magnus-Gymnasium is found in Rottweil, Germany.

In Managua, Nicaragua, the Albertus Magnus International Institute, a business and economic development research center, was founded in 2004.

In the Philippines, the Albertus Magnus Building at the University of Santo Tomas that houses the Conservatory of Music, College of Tourism and Hospitality Management, College of Education, and UST Education High School is named in his honor. The Saint Albert the Great Science Academy in San Carlos City, Pangasinan, which offers preschool, elementary and high school education, takes pride in having St. Albert as their patron saint. Its main building was named Albertus Magnus Hall in 2008. San Alberto Magno Academy in Tubao, La Union is also dedicated in his honor. This century-old Catholic high school continues to live on its vision-mission up to this day, offering Senior High school courses.

Due to his contributions to natural philosophy, the bacterium Agrobacterium albertimagni, the plant species Alberta magna, the crustacean Bodigiella albertimagni, the fossil brachiopod Albasphe albertimagni, and the asteroid 20006 Albertus Magnus were named after him.

Numerous Catholic elementary and secondary schools are named for him, including schools in Toronto; Calgary; Cologne; and Dayton, Ohio.

The Albertus typeface is named after him.
At the University of Notre Dame du Lac in Notre Dame, Indiana, the Zahm Hall Chapel is dedicated to St. Albert the Great. Fr. John Zahm, C.S.C., after whom the men's residence hall is named, looked to St. Albert's example of using religion to illumine scientific discovery. Fr. Zahm's work with the Bible and evolution is sometimes seen as a continuation of St. Albert's legacy.

The second largest student's fraternity of the Netherlands, located in the city of Groningen, is named Albertus Magnus, in honor of the saint.

The Colegio Cientifico y Artistico de San Alberto, Hopelawn, New Jersey, USA with a sister school in Nueva Ecija, Philippines was founded in 1986 in honor of him who thought and taught that religion, the sciences and the arts may be advocated as subjects which should not contradict each other but should support one another to achieve wisdom and reason.

The Vosloorus catholic parish (located in Vosloorus Extension One, Ekurhuleni, Gauteng, South Africa) is named after the saint.

The catholic parish in Leopoldshafen, near Karlsruhe in Germany is also named after him also considering the huge research center of the Karlsruhe Institute of Technology nearby, as he is the patron saint of scientists.

Since the death of King Albert I, the King's Feast is celebrated in Belgium on Albert's feast day.

Edinburgh's Catholic Chaplaincy serving the city's universities is named after St Albert.

Sant'Alberto Magno is a titular church in Rome.

Bibliography

Translations
 On Fate, (De Fato) translated by D.P. Curtin (Philadelphia, PA: Dalcassian Publishing Company: 2023). 
 On the Body of the Lord, translated by Sr. Albert Marie Surmanski, OP (Washington, D.C.: Catholic University of America Press: 2017).
 On the Causes of the Properties of the Elements, translated by Irven M. Resnick (Milwaukee: Marquette University Press, 2010) [translation of Liber de causis proprietatum elementorum]
 Questions concerning Aristotle's on Animals, translated by Irven M. Resnick and Kenneth F. Kitchell Jr. (Washington, D.C.: Catholic University of America Press, 2008) [translation of Quaestiones super De animalibus]
 The Cardinal Virtues: Aquinas, Albert, and Philip the Chancellor, translated by R. E. Houser (Toronto: Pontifical Institute of Mediæval Studies, 2004) [contains translations of Parisian Summa, part six: On the good and Commentary on the Sentences of Peter Lombard, book 3, dist. 33 & 36]
 The Commentary of Albertus Magnus on Book 1 of Euclid's Elements of Geometry, edited by Anthony Lo Bello (Boston: Brill Academic Publishers, 2003) [translation of Priumus Euclidis cum commento Alberti]
 On Animals: A Medieval Summa Zoologica, translated by Kenneth F. Kitchell Jr. and Irven Michael Resnick (Baltimore; London: Johns Hopkins University Press, 1999) [translation of De animalibus]
 Paola Zambelli, The Speculum Astronomiae and Its Enigma: Astrology, Theology, and Science in Albertus Magnus and His Contemporaries (Dordrecht; Boston: Kluwer Academic Publishers, 1992) [includes Latin text and English translation of Speculum astronomiae]
 Albert & Thomas: Selected Writings, translated by Simon Tugwell, Classics of Western Spirituality (New York: Paulist Press, 1988) [contains translation of Super Dionysii Mysticam theologiam]
 On Union with God, translated by a Benedictine of Princethorpe Priory (London: Burns Oates & Washbourne, 1911) [reprinted as (Felinfach: Llanerch Enterprises, 1991) and (London: Continuum, 2000)] [translation of De adherendo Deo]

See also
 Christian mysticism
 List of Catholic saints
 List of Roman Catholic scientist-clerics
 Saint Albert the Great, patron saint archive
 Science in the Middle Ages

Notes

References

Citations

Sources

 Sighart, Joachim (1876), Albert the Great : his life and scholastic labours: from original documents.

Further reading
 Collins, David J. "Albertus, Magnus or Magus? Magic, Natural Philosophy, and Religious Reform in the Late Middle Ages." Renaissance Quarterly 63, no. 1 (2010): 1–44.
 Honnefelder, Ludger (ed.) Albertus Magnus and the Beginnings of the Medieval Reception of Aristotle in the Latin West. From Richardus Rufus to Franciscus de Mayronis, (collection of essays in German and English), Münster Aschendorff, 2005.
 Jong, Jonathan. "Albert the Great: Patron Saint of Scientists", in: St Mary Magdalen School of Theology, Thinking Faithfully.
 Kovach, Francis J. & Shahan, Robert W. Albert the Great. Commemorative Essays, Norman: University of Oklahoma Press, 1980.
 Lemay, Helen Rodnite. Women's Secrets: A Translation of Pseudo-Albertus Magnus's De secretis mulierum with Commentaries. SUNY Series in Medieval Studies. Albany: SUNY Press, 1992.
 Miteva, Evelina. "The Soul between Body and Immortality: The 13th Century Debate on the Definition of the Human Rational Soul as Form and Substance", in: Philosophia: E-Journal of Philosophy and Culture, 1/2012. .
 Resnick, Irven (ed.), A Companion to Albert the Great: Theology, Philosophy, and the Sciences, Leiden, Brill, 2013.
 Resnick, Irven e Kitchell Jr, Kenneth (eds.), Albert the Great: A Selective Annotated Bibliography, (1900–2000), Tempe, Arizona Center for Medieval and Renaissance Studies, 2004.

External links

 
 
 
 
 
 
 Alberti Magni Works in Latin Online
 Albertus Magnus on Astrology & Magic
 "Albertus Magnus & Prognostication by the Stars"
 Albertus Magnus: "Secrets of the Virtues of Herbs, Stones and Certain Beasts", London, 1604, full online version.
 Albertus Magnus – De Adhaerendo Deo – On Cleaving to God
 Online Galleries, History of Science Collections, University of Oklahoma Libraries  – High resolution images of works by Albertus Magnus in .jpg and .tiff format.
 Albertus Magnus works at SOMNI in the collection of the Duke of Calabria.
 Alberti Magni De laudibus beate Mariae Virginis, Italian digitized codex of 1476 with a completed transcription of his work "Liber de laudibus gloriosissime Dei genitricis Marie"
 Albertus Magnus De mirabili scientia Dei, Italian digitized codex of 1484 with a transcription of the first part of his Summa Theologicae.

1280 deaths
13th-century Roman Catholic bishops in Bavaria
13th-century Christian mystics
13th-century German philosophers
13th-century Christian saints
13th-century German Catholic theologians
Aristotelian philosophers
People from Lauingen
Roman Catholic bishops of Regensburg
Dominican bishops
Natural philosophers
Discoverers of chemical elements
Doctors of the Church
German Dominicans
University of Padua alumni
Academic staff of the University of Paris
German astrologers
13th-century astrologers
German entomologists
Canonizations by Pope Pius XI
German Roman Catholic saints
Latin commentators on Aristotle
Catholic philosophers
Scholastic philosophers
Catholic clergy scientists
Dominican mystics
Dominican saints
Incorrupt saints
Year of birth unknown
German male non-fiction writers
Alsatian saints
13th-century Latin writers
13th-century alchemists
13th-century jurists
Provincial superiors
Writers about religion and science
Natural law ethicists